Human concentrative nucleoside transporters include SLC28A1, SLC28A2 and SLC28A3 proteins. SLC28A2 is a purine-specific Na+-nucleoside cotransporter localised to the bile canalicular membrane. SLC28A1 is a Na+-dependent nucleoside transporter selective for pyrimidine nucleosides and adenosine. It also transports the anti-viral nucleoside analogues Zidovudine and Zalcitabine.

References 

Protein families
Transmembrane transporters